A professional magazine or professional journal is a periodical published by the governing body of a profession. The standard of quality of such a periodical may be similar to that of a scholarly publication.

A professional journal is said to be one which is "published by the profession and for the profession", which cannot be charged with being dominated by trade, and which "serves a higher and therefore a better use" than a so-called trade journal "by printing in an unbiased way the subject matter".

References

Philip Ward Burton. Principles of Advertising. Prentice-Hall. 1955.
Christine Nolen Taylor. Publishing the Professional Journal or Newsletter: An Editors Guide. American Dental Association. 1981. Google Books
Klaus-Jürgen Evert (ed). "4609 Professional journal". Encyclopedic Dictionary of Landscape and Urban Planning. IFLA. Springer. Volume 1. Page 750
"Reports of Societies" [1854] Association Medical Journal (New Series, volume 2) 201

Magazine genres